The 1975 Women's Langham Life Assurance British Open Squash Championships was held at Wembley in London from 28 February - 6 March 1975. Heather McKay (née Blundell) won her fourteenth consecutive title defeating Marion Jackman in the final. The domination shown by Heather McKay was evident in the fact that she remained unbeaten in any competition since December 1962.

Seeds

Draw and results

First round

Second round

Third round

Quarter-finals

Semi-finals

Third-place play-off

Final

References

Women's British Open Squash Championships
Women's British Open
British Open Squash Championship
Women's British Open Squash Championship
Squash competitions in London
British open
Women's British Open Squash Championship
Women's British Open Squash Championship